Yeni Marcela Arias Castañeda (born 23 December 1990) is a Colombian boxer. She competed in the women's featherweight event at the 2020 Summer Olympics.

References

1990 births
Living people
Colombian women boxers
Olympic boxers of Colombia
Boxers at the 2020 Summer Olympics
Boxers at the 2019 Pan American Games
Pan American Games bronze medalists for Colombia
Pan American Games medalists in boxing
Medalists at the 2019 Pan American Games
South American Games medalists in boxing
Competitors at the 2018 South American Games
Central American and Caribbean Games silver medalists for Colombia
Central American and Caribbean Games medalists in boxing
Competitors at the 2018 Central American and Caribbean Games
Sportspeople from Valle del Cauca Department
21st-century Colombian women
South American Games silver medalists for Colombia